Verlegenhukflya is a coastal plain in Ny-Friesland at Spitsbergen, Svalbard. It is located at the northern part of the peninsula Mosselhalvøya. The northernmost point of the plain is Verlegenhuken.

References

Plains of Spitsbergen